NGC 441 is a lenticular galaxy of type (R')SB(rs)0/a? located in the constellation Sculptor. It was discovered on September 27, 1834 by John Herschel. It was described by Dreyer as "prety faint, small, round, gradually brighter middle."

References

External links
 

0441
18340927
Sculptor (constellation)
Lenticular galaxies
004429